Corybas incurvus, commonly known as the slaty helmet orchid, is a species of terrestrial orchid endemic to south-eastern Australia. It has a broad egg-shaped to heart-shaped leaf and a dark purple flower with a white patch in the middle.

Description 
The leaf is dark green on the upper surface and silvery green on the lower side. There is a white patch in the centre of the labellum and the edges turn inwards and have a few short teeth. Flowering occurs from June to August.

Taxonomy 
Corybas incurvus was first formally described in 1988 by David Jones and Mark Clements from a specimen collected near Tyabb and the description was published in the Kew Bulletin. The specific epithet (incurvus) refers to the in-turned edges of the labellum.

Distribution and habitat
The slaty helmet orchid grows in moist heath, woodland and forest south from Cowra in New South Wales, in all but the north-west of Victoria, in the south-east of South Australia and in Tasmania.

References

External links 

incurvus
Endemic orchids of Australia
Orchids of New South Wales
Orchids of the Australian Capital Territory
Orchids of Victoria (Australia)
Orchids of South Australia
Orchids of Tasmania
Plants described in 1988